Neomura is a possible clade composed of the two domains of life of Archaea and Eukaryota. The group was named by Thomas Cavalier-Smith in 2002. Its name means "new walls", reflecting his hypothesis that it evolved from Bacteria, and one of the major changes was the replacement of peptidoglycan cell walls with other glycoproteins. , the neomuran hypothesis is not accepted by most workers; molecular phylogenies suggest that eukaryotes are most closely related to one group of archaeans and evolved from them, rather than forming a clade with all archaeans, and that Archaea and Bacteria are sister groups.

Morphology 
Considered as a clade, the Neomura are a very diverse group, containing all of the multicellular species, as well as all of the most extremophilic species, but they all share certain molecular characteristics.  All neomurans have histones to help with chromosome packaging, and most have introns.  All use the molecule methionine as the initiator amino acid for protein synthesis (bacteria use formylmethionine).  Finally, all neomurans use several kinds of RNA polymerase, whereas bacteria use only one.

Phylogeny 

There are several hypotheses for the phylogenetic relationships between archaeans and eukaryotes.

Three-domain view 

When Carl Woese first published his three-domain system in 1990, it was believed that the domains Bacteria, Archaea, and Eukaryota were equally old and equally related on the tree of life.  However certain evidence began to suggest that Eukaryota and Archaea were more closely related to each other than either was to Bacteria.  This evidence included the common use of cholesterols and proteasomes, which are complex molecules not found in most bacteria, leading to the inference that the root of life lay between Bacteria on the one hand, and Archaea and Eukaryota combined on the other, i.e. that there were two primary branches of life subsequent to the LUCA – Bacteria and Neomura (not then called by this name).

The "three primary domains" (3D) scenario was one of the two hypotheses considered plausible in a 2010 review of the origin of eukaryotes.

Derived clade view 

In a 2002 paper, and subsequent papers, Thomas Cavalier-Smith and coworkers have promulgated a hypothesis that Neomura was a clade deeply nested with Eubacteria with Actinomycetota as its sister group. He wrote, "Eukaryotes and archaebacteria form the clade neomura and are sisters, as shown decisively by genes fragmented only in archaebacteria and by many sequence trees. This sisterhood refutes all theories that eukaryotes originated by merging an archaebacterium and an α-proteobacterium, which also fail to account for numerous features shared specifically by eukaryotes and actinobacteria."

These include the presence of cholesterols and proteasomes in Actinomycetota as well as in Neomura. Features of this complexity are unlikely to evolve more than once in separate branches, so either there was a horizontal transfer of those two pathways, or Neomura evolved from this particular branch of the bacterial tree.

Two domains view 

As early as 2010, the major competitor to the three domains scenario for the origin of eukaryotes was the "two domains" (2D) scenario, in which eukaryotes emerged from within the archaea. The discovery of a major group within the Archaea, Lokiarchaeota, to which eukaryotes are more genetically similar than to other archaeans, is not consistent with the Neomura hypothesis. Instead, it supports the hypothesis that eukaryotes emerged from within one group of archaeans:

A 2016 study using 16 universally-conserved ribosomal proteins supports the 2D view. Its "new view of the tree of life" shows eukaryotes as a small group nested within Archaea, in particular within the TACK superphylum. However, the origin of eukaryotes remains unresolved, and the two domain and three domain scenarios remain viable hypotheses.

See also
Protocell

References

Further reading

 
 
 
 
 
 

Phylogenetics
Taxa named by Thomas Cavalier-Smith